Simon was a Hungarian prelate in the 12th century, who served as the first known Bishop of Transylvania during the reign of Coloman, King of Hungary. His name is mentioned by two royal charters of Coloman issued regarding the Zobor Abbey in 1111 and 1113.

Notes

Sources

 
 

|-

|-

12th-century Roman Catholic bishops in Hungary
11th-century Hungarian people
12th-century Hungarian people
Bishops of Transylvania